The Roman Catholic Diocese of Brugnato (Latin: Dioecesis Brugnatensis) was a Roman Catholic diocese located in the city of Brugnato in the Province of La Spezia in the Italian region Liguria of Italy. On 25 November 1820, it was united with and suppressed to the Diocese of Luni e Sarzana to form the Diocese of Luni, Sarzana e Brugnato.

History
1133 May 27: Established as Diocese of Brugnato from the Archdiocese of Genoa and Diocese of Luni
1797 July 4: Lost territory to establish Diocese of Pontremoli
1854: Lost territory to the Diocese of Massa Carrara
1855: Lost territory to the Diocese of Pontremoli
1929 January 12: Lost territory to establish the Diocese of La Spezia
1959 July 26: Gained territory from Diocese of Apuania and exchanged territory with Diocese of Chiavari
1986 September 30: Suppressed, territory and name transferred to the Diocese of La Spezia–Sarzana–Brugnato)

Bishops of Brugnato
Erected: 1133
Latin Name: Brugnatensis
Metropolitan: Archdiocese of Genoa

Antonio Vergafalce (1438–1467 Died)
Barthelemy Uggeri (1467–1479 Died)
Antonio Da Valditaro (1478–1491 Died)
Simone Chiavari, O.S.B. (1492–1502 Resigned)
Lorenzo Fieschi (1502–1510 Appointed, Bishop of Ascoli Piceno)
Melchiorre Grimaldi (1510–1512 Died)
Filippo Sauli (1512–1528 Died)
Girolamo Grimaldi (1528–1535 Resigned)
Agostino Trivulzio (1539–1548 Resigned)
Antonio Cogorno, O.P. (1548–1565 Resigned)
Giulio Sauli (bishop) (1565–1570 Died)
Antonio Paliettino (de Monelia), O.F.M. Conv. (1571–1578 Died)
Nicolò Mascardi (1579–1584 Appointed, Bishop of Accia and Mariana)
Camillo Daddeo (Doddeo) (1584–1592 Appointed, Bishop of Fossano)
Stefano Bagliani (Baliano) (1592–1609 Died)
Francesco Mottini (1609–1623 Died)
Vincenzo Giovanni Spínola, O.S.A. (1623–1639 Died)
Francesco Durazzi (1640–1652 Died)
Giantommaso Gastaldi, O.P. (1652–1655 Died)
Giovanni Battista Paggi (bishop), B. (1655–1663 Died)
Giambattista Dadece (de Dece), C.R. (1663–1696 Died)
François Marie Sacco (Francesco Maria Sacco), C.R. (1697–1721 Died)
Nicolò Leopoldo Lomellini (1722–1754 Died)
Domenico Tatis, O.S.B. (1754–1765 Died)
Francesco Maria Gentile (1767–1791 Appointed, Bishop of Luni e Sarzana)
Giovanni Luca Solari (1792–1810 Died)

25 November 1820: The diocese was suppressed, and its territory united with the Diocese of Luni e Sarzana to form the Diocese of Luni, Sarzana e Brugnato

See also
Catholic Church in Italy

References

Former Roman Catholic dioceses in Italy